Love Remains may refer to:
"Love Remains" (song), by Collin Raye written by Tom Douglas and Jim Daddario 1996
Love Remains (Bobby Watson album), 1988
Love Remains (Hillary Scott album), 2016
Love Remains (How to Dress Well album), 2010
Love Remains, 2019 album by Tal Wilkenfeld
Love Remains, novel by Glen Duncan 2000